South Central is a 1992 American crime-drama film, written and directed by Stephen Milburn Anderson. This film is an adaptation of the 1987 fictional novel, The Original South Central L.A. Crips by Donald Bakeer, a former high school teacher in South Central Los Angeles. The film stars Glenn Plummer, Byron Minns and Christian Coleman. South Central was produced by Oliver Stone and released by Warner Bros.

The movie received wide critical acclaim, with New Yorker Magazine praising it as one of the year's best independent films. Janet Maslin of The New York Times named Anderson in the "Who's Who Among Hot New Filmmakers" in 1992, along with Quentin Tarantino and Tim Robbins.

Plot
Upon his parole from the California Youth Authority, Hoover Street Deuces gang member Bobby Johnson meets with girlfriend Carole, son Jimmie, and fellow "Deuces" Ray Ray, Loco, and Bear. The gang attends a party thrown by a heroin dealer named Genie Lamp, who forces Bobby to snort a line of heroin. Bobby and Jimmie return home in the morning to find Carole passed out on the couch from smoking PCP. The Deuces return to Genie Lamp's club, where they shoot Genie's bodyguard and Bobby shoots Genie. Bobby returns home and tells Carole that they have to move immediately. Soon after, the gang is caught and Bobby gets a ten year prison sentence for the murder.

Ten years later, Bobby's son Jimmie has followed his father into the gang life. He begins stealing car stereos and selling them to Ray Ray for $20 each. Jimmie is shot in the back by a man named Willie Manchester while attempting to steal Willie's car radio. After recuperating in the hospital, he goes to a juvenile halfway house.

In prison, Bobby becomes a respected gang leader, falls from grace, and turns his life around with the help of his cellmate, Ali. Once released, he returns to South Central Los Angeles and drives to the halfway house to find Jimmie. Jimmie is shocked that his father has denounced the Deuce gang and will not seek revenge against Willie Manchester. Jimmie insults Bobby for not being the proud Deuce gang leader that he thought his father would be.

Jimmie breaks out of the halfway house and hides out with Ray Ray. Bobby goes to Ray Ray's warehouse and the two have a talk. Ray Ray opens up a door that reveals a kidnapped Willie Manchester. Ray Ray gives Jimmie a gun and tries to talk him into shooting Willie. Willie begs for his life and tells Jimmie that he did not mean to shoot him. Bobby takes Bear's gun and threatens to kill Ray Ray, but puts the gun down when he sees the look on Jimmie's face. Bobby talks to Jimmie about the mistake it would be if Jimmie killed Willie Manchester. Bobby states that Jimmie can replace goods that he steals from a man, but he cannot replace a man's life that he took. Jimmie lets go of the gun he had been holding.

Ray Ray lets go of Jimmie, Bobby, and Willie Manchester. Bobby tells Jimmie that they must start their lives over, but this time they will do it the right way. The scene fades to black as the two walk out of the warehouse together as father and son.

Cast
 Glenn Plummer as 'OG' Bobby Johnson
 Christian Coleman as Jimmie 'J-Rock' Johnson
 Byron Keith Minns as Ray 'Ray-Ray' DeWitt
 Carl Lumbly as Ali
 Lexie Bigham as 'Bear' (Credited as Lexi D. Bigham)
 Vincent Craig Dupree as 'Loco'
 LaRita Shelby as Carole
 Ivory Ocean as Willie Manchester
 Vickilyn Reynolds as Mrs. Manchester, Willie's Wife
 Tim DeZarn as 'Buddha'
 Starletta Dupois as Nurse Shelly

Soundtrack

A soundtrack containing hip hop, soul and R&B music was released on September 18, 1992 by Hollywood Records.

Reception 
South Central received positive reviews, with many praising Plummer’s performance. Owen Gleiberman of Entertainment Weekly wrote the film “offers a wrenching view of modern youth-gang violence by demonstrating, with desperate candor, that the civilized alternatives are fast disappearing”.

See also 
 List of hood films

References

External links
 
 
 South Central at AllMovie
 

1992 crime drama films
1992 films
American gang films
American independent films
American crime drama films
Films set in Los Angeles
Hood films
Warner Bros. films
1992 directorial debut films
1992 independent films
Films about father–son relationships
1990s English-language films
1990s American films